af Uglas is a Swedish family name, meaning "of Owls". It can refer to:
Bertil af Ugglas (1934–1977), Swedish politician and elected official
Caroline af Ugglas (born 1972), Swedish singer, artist and chorister
Ludvig af Ugglas (1814–1880), Swedish politician and member of the upper house of the Parliament of Sweden
Margaretha af Ugglas (born 1939), Swedish former Moderate Party politician and Minister for Foreign Affairs